Hicksville High School is a public high school in Hicksville, Ohio.  It is the only high school in the Hicksville Schools district.  Their nickname is the Aces.  They are a member of the Green Meadows Conference.

Ohio High School Athletic Association State Championships

 Baseball OHSAA Final Four - 1982,2015,2018
 
 Football OHSAA Final Four - 2004, 2011
 Boys Baseball – 1978

References

External links
 District Website

High schools in Defiance County, Ohio
Public high schools in Ohio